Diego Arana Antoñanzas (born 12 September 1988) is a Spanish field hockey player who plays as a forward for Jolaseta and the Spanish national team.

Club career
Arana played in Spain for Jolaseta and Club de Campo until 2014, when he moved to Belgium to play for Braxgata. In the 2015–16 season he helped them claim their first-ever play-off place in the Men's Belgian Hockey League. After two seasons in Belgium he returned to Spain to play for Tenis. In 2017 he left Spain again, this time he went to the Netherlands to play for Pinoké. After one season with Pinoké he returned to Jolaseta. In June 2019, it was announced he would join Herakles in Belgium for the 2019–20 season. He returned to Jolaseta after a half season to improve his chances for selection in the Spain squad.

International career
Arana made his debut for the senior national team in December 2016 in a test match against Ireland. He represented Spain at the 2018 World Cup. At the 2019 EuroHockey Championship, he won his first medal with the national team as they finished second.

References

External links

1988 births
Living people
Sportspeople from Bilbao
Spanish male field hockey players
Male field hockey forwards
2018 Men's Hockey World Cup players
Club de Campo Villa de Madrid players
División de Honor de Hockey Hierba players
Men's Belgian Hockey League players
Men's Hoofdklasse Hockey players
Expatriate field hockey players
Spanish expatriate sportspeople in Belgium
Spanish expatriate sportspeople in the Netherlands
Field hockey players from the Basque Country (autonomous community)